USNS Mendonca (T-AKR-303) was a Bob Hope-class roll on roll off vehicle cargo ship of the United States Navy. She was built by Northrop Grumman Ship Systems, New Orleans and delivered to the Navy on 30 January 2001. They assigned her to the United States Department of Defense's Military Sealift Command. Mendonca is named for Medal of Honor recipient Sergeant Leroy A. Mendonca, and is one of 11 Surge LMSRs operated by a private company under contract to the Military Sealift Command. She was assigned to the MSC Atlantic surge force and is maintained in Ready Operational Status 4. On 26 September 2022, Mendonca left service and was stricken from the Naval Vessel Register.

References

Further reading

Bob Hope-class vehicle cargo ships
Auxiliary ships of the United States
1999 ships
Ships built in New Orleans